Luk Wu Tsuen is an area and a village of Lantau Island in Hong Kong, home to several Buddhist monasteries.

The place was named as such since deer could be found there in the past and the landscape looks like a lake.

Administration
Luk Wu is a recognized village under the New Territories Small House Policy.

Features
Luk Wu, together with Ngong Ping, Keung Shan, Tei Tong Tsai and Man Cheung Po are considered as the five major Buddhist sites of Lantau Island, hosting numerous temples and gardens.

References

External links
 Delineation of area of existing village Keung Shan, Upper and Luk Wu (Tai O) for election of resident representative (2019 to 2022)
 An Oral History of Luk Wu 
 Draft Luk Wu and Keung Shan Outline Zoning Plan approved, September 18, 2015
 Pictures of Fat Chuen Chi, Luk Wu Tsuen

Lantau Island
Populated places in Hong Kong